The Research Council of Norway's Award for Excellence in Communication of Science is awarded annually by the Research Council of Norway, a Norwegian government body. According to its bylaws, the prize is to be given in order to "reward and stimulate the dissemination of research to a broad audience. The dissemination must be of high quality in both form and content." The price is worth .

Award winners 
 2020 Anne Sverdrup-Thygeson
 2019 Audun Rikardsen University of Tromsø
 2018 Bjørn H. Samset, Centre for International Climate and Environmental Research 
 2017 Henrik H. Svensen, University of Oslo
 2016 Ingun Grimstad Klepp, Oslo Metropolitan University
 2015 Anine Kierulf, University of Oslo
 2014: Frank Aarebrot, Department of Comparative Politics, University of Bergen
 2013: Jorunn Sundgot-Borgen, Sports Medicine Section, Norwegian School of Sport Sciences
 2012: Nils Christian Stenseth, Department of Biology and the Centre for Ecological and Evolutionary Synthesis, University of Oslo
 2011: Kalle Moene, Head of the Centre of Equality, Social Organization and Performance (ESOP), University of Oslo
 2010: The website, Forskning.no
 2009: Jørn H. Hurum, Natural History Museum at the University of Oslo
 2008: Ole Didrik Lærum, Gades Institute, University of Bergen.
 2007: Egil Lillestøl, Department of Physics and Technology, University of Bergen 
 2006: Wenche Blomberg, Institute of Criminology and Legal Sociology, University of Oslo
 2005: Terje Tvedt, Head of Research at the Center for Development Studies, University of Bergen
 2004: Odd Aksel Bergstad, MAR-ECO Project
 2003: Bente Træen, Department of Psychology, University of Tromsø
 2002: Thomas Hylland Eriksen, Department of Social Anthropology, University of Oslo
 2001: Michael Baziljevich, Department of Physics, University of Oslo
 2000: NRK P2s pop-science radio program Verdt å vite
 1999: Henry Valen, Norwegian Institute of Social Research
 1998: Dag O. Hessen, University of Oslo
 1997: Asgeir Brekke, University of Tromsø, and Professor Alv Egeland, University of Oslo
 1996: Lisbet Holtedahl, University of Tromsø

References 

Awards established in 1996
1996 establishments in Norway
1996 in science
Science communication awards
Norwegian science and technology awards